Sin-Eater is a name given to several fictional characters appearing in American comic books published by Marvel Comics. The character usually appears in comics featuring Spider-Man and Ghost Rider.

Publication history

The character was introduced in Peter Parker, the Spectacular Spider-Man #107 (October 1985).

Spider-Man-related fictional character biographies

Stanley Carter
Stanley "Stan" Carter was born in Fort Meade, Maryland. He was an agent of S.H.I.E.L.D. working in research and development. He was injected with experimental drugs to increase strength and endurance, but when the program was designated too dangerous it was discontinued. Carter became violent and resigned from S.H.I.E.L.D., eventually becoming a detective with the New York City Police Department. After his partner was killed by several young criminals, he became obsessed with killing anyone who "sinned" by abusing authority.

As the Sin-Eater, his first victim was Captain Jean DeWolff (in "The Death of Jean DeWolff" story arc). As a detective, he is assigned to find the killer, and works closely with Spider-Man. His next victim is Judge Horace Rosenthal, a friend of Matthew Murdock. During his escape after killing Rosenthal, he is attacked by Spider-Man and kills a bystander during the battle. When Spider-Man and Daredevil discover that the Sin-Eater's next victim is going to be Betty Brant, Peter Parker's first love, they rush to save Betty. Spider-Man goes into a fierce rage and beats the Sin-Eater nearly to death. As he is being transferred to Riker's, a vengeful mob including DeWolff's father tries to kill him, but Daredevil and Spider-Man intervene.

Carter is put in psychological and medical care, but is crippled by the beating Spider-Man inflicted. S.H.I.E.L.D. purge all the drugs from his system during this time, but he still has visions of his Sin-Eater persona. After Carter is released, he returns the favor Spider-Man did him by rescuing the latter from an angry mob, and begins writing a memoir of his career as the Sin-Eater. However, he has trouble readjusting to society. Finally he snaps, taking an empty shotgun and goading police officers into opening fire on him. Carter is killed, though finally freed from the Sin-Eater persona's control.

The Sin-Eater is later resurrected for Kindred's next plot against Spider-Man. While in their safehouse, the Inner Demons were attacked by the revived Sin-Eater as Overdrive took his car and drove away wishing that his attacker was the Punisher. Overdrive raced for three days trying to avoid the Sin-Eater. On the day where Spider-Man's dream predicted his death, Overdrive found Spider-Man and asked for his protection only to be shot by the Sin-Eater using a special gun. Carlie Cooper examined his body in the morgue when Overdrive somehow returned to life and found no bodily damages on him. When the Lethal Legion (consisting of Count Nefaria, Grey Gargoyle, Living Laser, and Whirlwind) attacked Empire State University and fought Spider-Man, Sin-Eater crashed the battle. Upon using his special gun on Grey Gargoyle and Whirlwind, the Sin-Eater copied Grey Gargoyle's powers and immobilized Spider-Man. Then he used his gun on Living Laser and Count Nefaria. When the Lethal Legion was at Ravencroft, Norah Winters interviewed Count Nefaria at the approval of Norman Osborn where Norah learned that they have suddenly regretted their sins. Due to the Sin-Eater having taken away his powers, Overdrive was placed on life support as Carlie keeps an eye on him. Spider-Man wonders how Overdrive can be in critical condition while everyone else that the Sin-Eater "cleansed" were sent to Ravencroft. Norah was later confronted in her car by the Sin-Eater. Acting in self-defense, Norah shoots the Sin-Eater point blank only for it to not harm him. The Sin-Eater does allow her to record a manifesto. After showing it to J. Jonah Jameson who was apprehensive about it, Norah posts the Sin-Eater's manifesto anyway. After cleansing some low-level criminals, the Sin-Eater taunts Spider-Man again while overpowering him with the stolen powers while stating who his next target is. When a riot occurs at Ravencroft, Osborn is informed by Count Nefaria that the Sin-Eater is coming for him. The Sin-Eater and his followers start purging those who have committed bad acts of their sins as Spider-Man learns that he is going after Osborn. Arriving at Ravencroft, the Sin-Eater dispenses the powers he has stolen onto his followers and sends them after Osborn. Spider-Man was able to get to him and fight off the Sin-Eater's followers. Having stolen Mister Negative's powers, the Sin-Eater corrupts the guards to his side. Then he corrupts a clone of Ashley Kafka to release Juggernaut so that he can steal his powers. Using Juggernaut's powers, the Sin-Eater and his followers pursue Spider-Man and Osborn as the Order of the Web considers waiting for the Sin-Eater to cleanse Osborn before intervening. As Spider-Man and Osborn escape underground, the Sin-Eater catches up to them. As Spider-Man holds onto the Sin-Eater to restrain him, Osborn activates an EMP to liquefy the floor beneath them. After freeing himself, the Sin-Eater caught up to Osborn and purged him of his sins. Kindred shows up and berates the Sin-Eater for his own crimes. Then Kindred presumably kills the Sin-Eater by erupting him of demonic energy after he served his purpose. The Sin-Eater's followers were later arrested by the police.

During the Last Remains storyline, the Sin-Eater survived the attack as he regains his memories of killing Jean DeWolff. The few followers that evaded capture catch up to the Sin-Eater and confirm that Osborn has been cleansed of his sins. After praying to the Sin-Eater for forgiveness, he beats a dissenter in his followers to death. Then he makes plans to take the powers of someone who has hunted the Spiders after hearing about the Order of the Web being controlled by Kindred. It is shown that Morlun has escaped his imprisonment. The Sin-Eater and his remaining followers break into a vault to steal the Spider-Queen's spider-virus. Once that was done, the Sin-Eater exposes some of his remaining followers with the spider-virus which turned them into Man-Spiders. This was enough to attract Morlun to their location. As Morlun started feasting on the Man-Spiders, he is attacked by the Sin-Eater. As Morlun starts to overwhelm him, the Sin-Eater traps Morlun and uses his grenade to subdue him and his gun to shoot him. Kindred shows Spider-Man the mirror that revealed that the Sin-Eater has purged Morlun of his sins. Then the Sin-Eater is shown in the cemetery awaiting for the Order of the Web to enter. To make matters worse for Spider-Man, Mary Jane Watson is shown about to enter the cemetery. Using the powers of Morlun, the Sin-Eater fights the Order of the Web. He started to defeat them until Madame Web talked the Sin-Eater into absorbing her sins. When he does, he taps into Madame Web's precognition to see that Kindred was just using him. This caused the Sin-Eater to turn the gun on himself. Madame Web tried to resuscitate him only for her and the Order of the Web to be captured by Kindred. As a side-effect of the Sin-Eater's suicide, those who had their sins purged from them regain their sins and go on a rampage in New York City.

During the Sinister War storyline, Kindred revives the Sin-Eater again. He is still angered at Kindred for forsaking him once more. From the Sin-Eater's reanimated corpse springs forth demonic centipedes that seek out and take possession of Grey Gargoyle, Living Laser, Whirlwind, Juggernaut, and Morlun. Led by the Sin-Eater, the "Sinful Six" corner Peter in an alleyway and are ready to finish him off.

Emil Gregg
The public revelation of Stanley Carter as the Sin-Eater by Peter Parker was responsible for the ruin of Eddie Brock's journalistic career due to having published a series of articles on the Sin-Eater in The Daily Globe based on interviews with Emil Gregg, another man who claimed to be the Sin-Eater but was actually Carter's delusional neighbor, who believed that Carter recording his war journal (which he heard through his apartment wall) were voices in his head. This led to Brock's hatred of Peter and eventually to the former's joining with the Venom symbiote.

During the "AXIS" storyline, a new and supernatural Sin-Eater emerges to terrorize New York City, gunning down members of the press. Cletus Kasady (whose morality had been altered by a spell cast by Doctor Doom and the Scarlet Witch) comes into conflict with the Sin-Eater when he stops him from murdering the reporter Alice Gleason. The Sin-Eater later manages to track down and abduct Alice, taking her to his lair and implying that he is an undead version of Emil Gregg. Before the Sin-Eater can harm Alice, she is rescued by Carnage who allows the Sin-Eater to absorb all of his repressed evil. Overwhelmed by Carnage's sins, the Sin-Eater grows to gigantic size and explodes as Carnage declares "Rest now, wandering soul. Your work is done".

Empowered by the Grendel symbiote during the "Absolute Carnage" storyline, Kasady later resurrects Gregg as a zombie-like creature, which he lets loose in New York City. Donning a facsimile of the Sin-Eater costume, Gregg kidnaps several children with the intention of sacrificing them to the symbiote god Knull, but he is stopped and destroyed by Eddie Brock.

Michael G. Engelschwert
A Sin-Eater copycat killer appears in the Venom: Sinner Takes All mini-series. Michael Engelschwert, a veteran of the Gulf War, bunked in a homeless shelter next to the Sin-Eater copycat Emil Gregg. Gregg's late night ramblings drive Engelschwert to emulate the Sin-Eater delusions. He appears on the steps of a courthouse wielding a shotgun and kills several people, while injuring Anne Weying, the ex-wife of the anti-hero Eddie Brock. He breaks into a hospital in order to finish Weying off, only to find that Venom has set himself up as her protector. Despite his lack of super-powers, Engelschwert is able to consistently stay two steps ahead of Venom and the police as he continues his killing spree. He is finally stopped when another psychopath with a shotgun shoots him in the back. Realizing the wound is fatal, he sets off a bomb strapped to his chest.

Powers and abilities
The true version had an artificially heightened physicality, similar to that of Captain America. Though his strength, agility, stamina and reflexes was greater than that of any Olympic athlete, it did not exceed the hypothetical natural limitations of the human body and would not be considered truly superhuman. The same clandestine experiments that heightened his physique probably also drove him insane. He had also undergone military training, though it was rendered less effective by his insanity. He is an expert hand-to-hand combatant and skilled marksman, with his signature weapon being a double-barreled shotgun. When revived by Kindred, Sin-Eater wielded a special gun that removed any superhuman's powers and destroyed their sins. In addition, he can turn the sins into actual monsters, teleport, and absorb the powers of anyone he shoots. He has demonstrated making use of Overdrive's limited technopathy and vehicle alteration, Count Nefaria's ionic abilities, Grey Gargoyle's petrifying touch, Living Laser's laser projection, Whirlwind's rotation and wind-based abilities, Mister Negative's corruption touch, and Juggernaut's Cyttorak-based empowerment.

The second version introduced claims of being able to detect the evil within others, and of absorbing a green energy which he claims is all of their sins after killing them. He is also unaffected by being repeatedly shot with a handgun and regrows his own head (which is merely a skull) after it is destroyed by Carnage.

The third version wielded a heavy assortment of guns, bombs, knives, and rocket launchers, and wore a bulletproof costume.

Ghost Rider related fictional character biographies

Ethan Domblue
An earlier character named Sin-Eater first appeared in Ghost Rider #80. Ethan Domblue was a pastor obsessed with having a sinless congregation. Ghost Rider foe Centurious gave Ethan the power to "eat" his congregation's sins, leaving them in a passive, "sinless" state. He did not realize that by placing his parishioners' souls in the Crystal of Souls, he was creating an army of zombie-like slaves loyal to Centurious. Eventually, Ghost Rider defeated Centurious and freed the souls in the Crystal. As a last redemptive act, Ethan Domblue removed Zarathos from Johnny Blaze and placed the demon in the Crystal of Souls, freeing Blaze from the curse of Ghost Rider.

Reverend Styge
The Dan Ketch Ghost Rider also had a foe that was referred to as the Sin-Eater. Jim Sharp aka Reverend Styge, a cannibal under service of Centurious was granted power by Chthon to raise the dead by eating the living.

Reception
 In 2014, WhatCulture ranked Sin-Eater 5th in their "7 Unused Spider-Man Villains Who'd Be Great In The Marvel Cinematic Universe" list.
 In 2022, Screen Rant ranked Sin-Eater 4th in their "10 Most Powerful Silk Villains In Marvel Comics" list.

In other media

Television
 Stan Carter appears in The Spectacular Spider-Man, voiced by Thomas F. Wilson. This version is a uniformed police sergeant partnered with Officer Jean DeWolff who supports Spider-Man's activities as opposed to his partner.

Novels
 Stanley Carter appears in the novel Spider-Man: Requiem, by Jeff Mariotte. This version became Carrion after the Cabal of Scrier used the carrion virus to resurrect him so he can steal the Darkhold from S.H.I.E.L.D. on their behalf. Carter comes into conflict with Spider-Man, but the former eventually fights Carrion for control of his body. When the Cabal of Scrier attempts to summon Chthon, Carter seemingly sacrifices himself to stop the Elder God. In reality, he hid himself away at his uncle, Emory Carter's, house, where the latter became infected by the carrion virus. Carter dies and Emory becomes the new Carrion, but he is defeated by Spider-Man.

References

External links
 Sin-Eater (Stanley Carter) at Marvel.com
 
 

Characters created by Peter David
Comics characters introduced in 1985
Comics characters introduced in 1995
Comics characters introduced in 2014
Fictional American police detectives
Fictional cannibals
Fictional characters from Maryland
Fictional demons and devils
Fictional gunfighters in comics
Fictional secret agents and spies
Fictional sergeants
Fictional serial killers
Fictional suicides
Marvel Comics demons
Marvel Comics martial artists
Marvel Comics police officers
Marvel Comics supervillains
S.H.I.E.L.D. agents
es:Comepecados